The 2004 Guernsey general election was held on 21 April 2004 to elect 45 members of the States of Guernsey. All 45 elected members were independents.

The Elections Ordinance, 2004 

There was a by-election in September 2005 to fill a vacancy in the district of St Peter Port South.

Results

Castel

South East

St Peter Port North

St Peter Port South

St Sampson

Vale

West

See also
 Politics of Guernsey
 Elections in Guernsey

References

Elections in Guernsey
2004 elections in Europe
2004 in Guernsey
April 2004 events in Europe